Muhittin Taylan (1910–1983) was a Turkish judge. He was president of the Constitutional Court of Turkey from 	14 July 1971 until 13 July 1975. In March 1973 his name was proposed as a candidate for the Turkish presidency.

References

External links
Web-site of the Constitutional Court of Turkey 

Turkish judges
Turkish civil servants
1910 births
1983 deaths
Presidents of the Constitutional Court of Turkey